Dziecinów is the name of two villages in Masovian Voivodeship, Poland:
Dziecinów, Kozienice County
Dziecinów, Otwock County